Canadian Libraries is a digital collection of ebooks and texts at the Internet Archive. This collection contains over 400,000 items sponsored by Canadian Library Partners:

 Agriculture and Agri-Food Canada
 Archdiocese of Toronto
 Ashbury College
 Balmoral Hall School
 Brock University
 Canadian Government Publications Portal
 Canadian Museum for Human Rights
 Carleton University
 City of Vancouver Archives
 Fraser-Hickson Institute Library
 Iter: Gateway to the Middle Ages and Renaissance
 Kingston Frontenac Public Library
 Legislative Assembly of Ontario
 Library and Archives Canada - Bibliotheque et Archives Canada
 McMaster University
 Memorial University of Newfoundland
 Microsoft
 National Institute for Newman Studies
 Ontario College of Art & Design
 Ontario Council of University Libraries and Member Libraries
 Ontario Ministry of the Environment
 Ontario Ministry of Natural Resources
 Osgoode Hall Law School Library
 Pickering College
 Queen's University
 Richard Charles Lee Canada-Hong Kong Library
 Royal Commissions of Ontario
 Royal Ontario Museum Library
 Royal St. George's College
 Ryerson University
 Saint Mary's College of California - In partnership with the University of Toronto
 Selwyn House School
 Shawnigan Lake School
 St. Andrew's College Archives
 Statistics Canada
 St. Michaels University School
 University of British Columbia
 Toronto Public Library:Research and Reference Libraries
 Trinity College School
 Tufts University and the National Science Foundation
 Ukrainian Canadian Students' Union
 United Farmers' Historical Society
 University of Alberta
 University of Guelph
 University of Ottawa
 University of Toronto Libraries
 University of Victoria
 Upper Canada College
 The University of Western Ontario
 York University Libraries

See also
 American Libraries

References

External links
 

Internet Archive collections